Sriwass  is an Indian film director, and screenwriter known for his works in Telugu cinema. He is known for directing comedy and action films like Loukyam and Dictator.

Filmography

References

Living people
Film directors from Hyderabad, India
Telugu film directors
Nandi Award winners
People from Raichur
1973 births
Filmfare Awards South winners
Indian action choreographers
21st-century Indian film directors
Screenwriters from Hyderabad, India